The boys' 110 metre hurdles competition at the 2018 Summer Youth Olympics was held on 13 and 16 October, at the Parque Polideportivo Roca.

Schedule 
All times are in local time (UTC-3).

Results

Stage 1

Stage 2

Final placing

External links
Stage 1 results
Stage 2 results
Final Placing
 

Athletics at the 2018 Summer Youth Olympics